Claudia Stamm (born 8 October 1970) is a German politician.

Early life and education
Stamm, born on 8 October 1970 in Würzburg of Bavaria, graduated from the Wirsberg-Gymnasium high school in Würzburg in 1990. She spent one year as an exchange student in Illinois, USA. She went on to complete her Master's in political science specialising in women's studies at the Eichstätt-Ingolstadt university, then at the University of Cologne, and at the University of Salamanca in Spain. 
After working for a women's association, she was employed in 1999 by Bayerischer Rundfunk as a freelance writer and editor.

Political career
On 3 April 2009, Stamm joined the political party Alliance 90/The Greens and was elected member of the Bavarian state parliament. In March 2017, she resigned from the party and carried on her mandate as an independent until October 2018 when she resigned from the state parliament.

In 2017, Stamm became one of the co-founders and chair person of the Mut political party. Stamm and the Mut party are in alliance with Yanis Varoufakis for the 2019 European Parliament election.

Personal life
Claudia Stamm is the daughter of Ludwig Stamm and the Christian Social Union politician and former state parliament president Barbara Stamm.

She was married to photographer Hajü Staudt, co-founder or the Mut party, until his sudden death in Munich from a heart attack on 30 July 2018, aged 59. They had two daughters and, from Staudt's previous marriage, three stepchildren.

Notes

References

Further reading

External links
Personal website
Mut party official website

Living people
Politicians from Würzburg
Alliance 90/The Greens politicians
21st-century German politicians
21st-century German women politicians
University of Cologne alumni
University of Salamanca alumni
1970 births